Tommy Armstrong (born 1939) is a former England international lawn and indoor bowler.

Bowls career

World Championships
He won a silver medal in the triples and bronze medal in the fours with John C Evans, Bill Irish and Peter Line at the 1976 World Outdoor Bowls Championship in Johannesburg. He also won a silver medal in the team event (Leonard Trophy).

Commonwealth Games
He represented England in the fours, at the 1982 Commonwealth Games in Brisbane, Queensland, Australia.

National
He has won the 1973 pairs title with Ronald Milburn, when bowling for the Penrith Castle Park BC at the national title.

References

Living people
English male bowls players
1939 births
Bowls players at the 1982 Commonwealth Games
Commonwealth Games competitors for England